R. Harry Bittle (born March 27, 1938) is a former Republican member of the Pennsylvania House of Representatives.

References

1938 births
Living people
Republican Party members of the Pennsylvania House of Representatives